The Monster Squad is a 1987 American black comedy horror film directed by Fred Dekker, and written by Dekker and Shane Black, who met as classmates at UCLA. Peter Hyams and Rob Cohen served as executive producers. It was released by TriStar Pictures on August 14, 1987. The film features pastiches of the Universal Monsters, led by Count Dracula. They are confronted by a group of savvy kids out to keep them from controlling the world.

While being financially unsuccessful during its theatrical run and receiving mixed reviews from critics, the film has gained a positive reception from audiences and has become a cult classic in the years since its release.

Plot
The Monster Squad is a club of pre-teens who idolize the Universal classic monster movies and their non-human stars. Club leader Sean Crenshaw, whose younger sister, Phoebe, desperately wants to join the club, is given the diary of legendary monster hunter Dr. Abraham Van Helsing, but his excitement abates when he finds it is written in German. Sean and the rest of the Monster Squadhis best friend and second in command Patrick Rhodes, clumsy overweight Horace, tough older kid Rudy Holloran and little Eugene, go to visit an elderly man, known as the "Scary German Guy", actually a kind gentleman and a former concentration camp prisoner, to translate the diary.

The diary describes, in great detail, an amulet that is composed of concentrated good. One day out of every century, as the forces of good and evil reach a balance, the otherwise indestructible amulet becomes vulnerable to destruction. With the next day of balance happening within a few days, at the stroke of midnight, the kids realize they must gain possession of the amulet and use itwith an incantation from Van Helsing's diaryto open a wormhole in the universe and cast the monsters into Limbo. As shown in the film's prelude, Van Helsing had unsuccessfully attempted this one hundred years ago in order to defeat his old adversary Count Dracula; his apprentices then emigrated to the United States to hide the amulet, where it was out of Dracula's immediate reach.

Nevertheless, Dracula seeks to obtain the amulet so that he can take over the world and plunge it into darkness. To this end, he assembles several of his most dangerous and monstrous allies: The Mummy, the Gill-man, The Wolf Man, and in addition, three school girls whom the Count transforms into his vampiric consorts. Dracula then steals a crate from a B-25 Mitchell in flight, containing Frankenstein's monster, thus completing his army. However, Frankenstein's monster is reluctant to aid Dracula, and wanders into the forest where he encounters Phoebe. Rather than being afraid, she shows him the kindness he has always sought, and they become friends. After Phoebe proves to the Monster Squad that Frankenstein's monster is not evil, he chooses to help the boys instead of Dracula. The Wolfman, when reverting to human form, is a recalcitrant follower of Dracula, and has been making calls to the police about the forthcoming carnage, which are dismissed as prank calls.

The amulet is buried in a stone room beneath a house that Dracula and the other monsters now occupy and where Van Helsing's diary was found. The secret room is littered with wards which prevent the monsters from taking it. The Monster Squad break into the house and acquire the amulet and narrowly escape Dracula's grasp. They confer with The Scary German Guy who informs them that the incantation must be read by a female virgin. As midnight approaches, the Squad makes their way to a local cathedral to make their last stand. Meanwhile, Dracula destroys their clubhouse with dynamite, drawing the attention of Sean's father, Police Detective Del, who has been charged with investigating the strange occurrences in town (as caused by Dracula's cohorts), but remains quite skeptical about their supernatural causes until he sees Dracula in person.

Unfortunately, the doors to the cathedral are locked, so the incantation must be read on the stoop, leaving the Squad vulnerable. They enlist Patrick's beautiful elder sister Lisa to help them, as she is the only virgin they know. However, the incantation fails since Lisa is actually not a virgin anymore. As the monsters close in, the Squad deduces that Phoebe must complete the task of opening the portal, and the German Guy attempts to help her read the incantation as the rest of the Squad fends off the monsters.

In the ensuing battle, Dracula's consorts, the Mummy, the Gill-man, and the Wolfman are defeated. Dracula arrives to destroy the amulet when Frankenstein's monster intervenes, impaling him on a wrought-iron cross. Phoebe finishes the incantation, opening the portal which begins to consume the bodies of the monsters. Dracula, still alive, attempts to drag Sean in with him. Sean impales Dracula with a wooden stake as Patrick grabs Sean before he can be sucked into the portal. Having briefly escaped from Limbo, Van Helsing appears, gives a thumbs up to Sean on a job well done, and pulls Dracula to his doom. As Frankenstein's monster is drawn into the portal, Phoebe holds onto him and pleads for him to stay. Knowing he doesn't belong on Earth, Frankenstein's monster lets go of Phoebe's hand, but accepts her gift of a stuffed animal to remember her by. The portal then closes, ensuring the world's safety.

In the aftermath, the United States Army arrives on the scene, having received a letter from Eugene earlier on asking for their help against the monsters. When the confused general fails to make sense of the situation, Sean steps forward and presents the man with his business card, identifying himself and his friends as "The Monster Squad".

Cast

 Andre Gower as Sean Crenshaw
 Robby Kiger as Patrick Rhodes
 Stephen Macht as Detective Del Crenshaw
 Duncan Regehr as Count Dracula
 Tom Noonan as Frankenstein's monster
 Brent Chalem as Horace 
 Ryan Lambert as Rudy Holloran
 Ashley Bank as Phoebe Crenshaw
 Michael Faustino as Eugene
 Jonathan Gries as Desperate Man / The Wolf Man
 Mary Ellen Trainor as Emily Crenshaw
 Leonardo Cimino as Scary German Guy
 Stan Shaw as Detective Rich Sapir
 Lisa Fuller as Lisa Rhodes
 Carl Thibault as The Wolf Man
 Tom Woodruff Jr. as Gill-man
 Michael Reid MacKay as Mummy
 Jack Gwillim as Abraham Van Helsing
 Adam Carl as Derek
 Jason Hervey as E.J.
 David Proval as Pilot
 Daryl Anderson as Co-Pilot
 Mary Albee as Vampire Bride #1
 Brynn Baron as Vampire Bride #2
 Julie Merrill as Vampire Bride #3

Reception

Though the film was a financial failure on its initial release, it subsequently developed a cult following.  Rotten Tomatoes, a review aggregator, reports that 56% of 25 surveyed critics gave the film a positive review; the average rating was 5.7/10 With the site's consensus stating, "A fun 80's adventure with a slightly scary twist, The Monster Squad offers tween-friendly horror with just enough of a kick".  Kevin Thomas of the Los Angeles Times wrote that it is "fun for the kid in all of us".  Vincent Canby of The New York Times called it "a feature-length commercial for a joke store that sells not-great, rubber monster masks".

Home video
The Monster Squad was first issued by Vestron Video in 1988 on VHS and LaserDisc. It was the film's only VHS release.

A 20th Anniversary Reunion of The Monster Squad was held with cast members and Dekker in attendance in April 2006 in Austin, Texas at the Alamo Drafthouse. This event was organized by the staff at Ain't It Cool News, longtime fans who, on a whim, decided to contact and try to connect the cast for a special screening. Two shows were held; both sold out with lines formed around the block; some audience members flew from as far as California. It was at this screening that Dekker had urged any interested fans to write the copyright holders via snail-mail. Ain't It Cool News also broke the news of the DVD release nine months later in January 2007. Michael Felsher of Red Shirt Pictures approached Lionsgate to produce and release the 20th anniversary edition.

The 20th anniversary special edition was released as a two-disc DVD by Lionsgate on July 24, 2007, and contains a variety of special features, including a five-part retrospective documentary, two audio commentaries, deleted scenes, trailers and TV spots, animated storyboards and more. In 2007, a soundtrack was made available from the Intrada label; La-La Land Records issued another in 2015 with additional material, including the Michael Sembello-produced songs.

Lionsgate released a region-free Blu-ray on November 24, 2009, containing the same extras as the DVD. This edition is now out of print. On February 19, 2013, Olive Films released a region A locked barebones Blu-ray. It became available via direct streaming on Hulu in October 2017.

Legacy
The Alamo Drafthouse held two further sold-out screenings on January 9, 2010 with Gower, Lambert and Gries along with Black and Dekker in attendance. The screenings were celebrated with a limited edition poster by artist Tyler Stout. Another event, with Gower and Lambert attending, will be held at the San Francisco branch on October 31, 2022.

In 2018, Gower directed and co-produced Wolfman's Got Nards, a documentary exploring the film's influence over thirty years and its evolution from cult favorite to cult classic. The film was distributed by Pilgrim Media Group in cooperation with Flitterpiper Entertainment and 1620 Media Group. It earned honors as an official selection for a number of film festivals, including Cinepocalypse and Salem Horror Fest.

Cancelled remake
In 2008, producer Rob Cohen said that the film rights were back with Paramount and there were plans to remake the film; however, he had no desire to direct.

In 2010, it was announced that Michael Bay's Platinum Dunes had officially signed on to produce with Cohen to direct and Mark and Brian Gunn writing the screenplay. The announcement of a remake and Platinum Dunes' involvement was met with generally negative fan reaction.

In 2014, Platinum Dunes producers Brad Fuller and Andrew Form confirmed that the remake was no longer in development.

See also
 List of films featuring Frankenstein's monster
 Vampire film
 List of monster movies

References

External links

 
 
 
 The Monster Squad at I-Mockery (also includes Monster Squad Commodore 64 game)
 Q&A with cast and crew
 The Monster Squad at Comic Con 2007 at Dread Central

1987 films
1987 horror films
1980s comedy horror films
American comedy horror films
1980s English-language films
1980s German-language films
1980s children's fantasy films
Crossover films
Dracula films
Frankenstein films
Mummy films
American werewolf films
TriStar Pictures films
Films directed by Fred Dekker
Films with screenplays by Shane Black
Films scored by Bruce Broughton
HBO Films films
1980s monster movies
Taft Entertainment Pictures films
1987 comedy films
Films about children
American vampire films
1980s American films